The following highways are numbered 724:

Canada

United States